Love Like This is the fifth studio album by English boy band Collabro. It was released on 15 November 2019 by BMG. The album peaked at number twenty-two on the UK Albums Chart.

Background
In September 2019, the band announced that they had signed a new record deal with BMG, they also announced the release date for their new album. On their social media accounts, the band said, "After 5 incredible years together, we're proud to announce we've signed a major new record deal with @BMG. We'll be releasing our 5th album #LoveLikeThis on 15th November this year, and we're going back out on tour in 2020."

Tour
In October 2019, the band announced they would tour the UK with the Love Like This Tour starting October 2020. However, due to the COVID-19 pandemic, the band made the decision to postpone the tour until Autumn 2021.

Commercial performance
On 18 November 2019 the album was at number ten on the Official Chart Update. On 22 November 2019, Love Like This entered the UK Albums Chart at number twenty-two, making it the bands fifth top forty album in the UK.

Track listing
Credits adapted from Tidal.

Charts

Release history

References

2019 albums
Collabro albums